"Mr. Brownstone" is a song by the American rock band Guns N' Roses, featured on their debut studio album, Appetite for Destruction (1987). Group guitarists Slash and  Izzy Stradlin wrote the tune while they were sitting around Stradlin's apartment complaining about their addictions to heroin, for which "Brownstone" is a slang term.

Composition
The lyrics make a clear reference to the tolerance that the drug causes: "I used to do a little, but a little wouldn't do it, so the little got more and more." They wrote the lyrics on the back of a grocery bag and brought it to Axl Rose. Slash said the lyrics describe a typical day in the life of Slash and Stradlin. He also states that it was the first song the band wrote after being signed by Geffen Records.

Single release
"Mr. Brownstone" was the first Guns N' Roses single released outside of the United States and appeared as the A-side of "It's So Easy" in the United Kingdom. In the US, it was used as the  B-side of "Welcome to the Jungle".

References

1987 songs
Guns N' Roses songs
1987 singles
Songs about heroin
Songs written by Izzy Stradlin
Songs written by Slash (musician)
Geffen Records singles